Kėdainiai Arena is a multifunctional arena in Kėdainiai between Kėdainiai Stadium and Nevėžis River. It was opened on August 5, 2013.

References

External links
 

Indoor arenas in Lithuania
Basketball venues in Lithuania
Buildings and structures in Kėdainiai
Sport in Kėdainiai
Culture in Kėdainiai